This is a list of football clubs located in Serbia and the leagues and divisions they play in 2011–12 season, as well as some other notable football clubs that play in the Serbian football league system.

Super League (Top tier)

2021/22 season

First League (Second tier)

 2021/22 season

Serbian League (Third tier)

Belgrade
 OFK Balkan Mirijevo
 FK BASK
 FK Beograd
 FK Dorćol
 FK Hajduk Beograd
 FK Kovačevac
 FK PKB Padinska Skela
 FK Radnički Obrenovac
 FK Sinđelić Beograd
 FK Slavija Beograd
 FK Sopot
 FK Srem Jakovo
 FK Šumadija Jagnjilo
 FK Voždovac
 FK Zemun
 FK Žarkovo

Vojvodina
 FK Mladost Apatin
 FK ČSK Pivara
 FK Kikinda
 FK Mladost Bački Jarak
 FK Palić
 FK Radnički Nova Pazova
 FK Senta
 FK Sloga Temerin
 FK Tekstilac Ites
 FK Cement Beočin
 FK Vršac
 FK Donji Srem
 FK Veternik
 FK Dolina Padina
 FK Sloboda Novi Kozarci
 FK Solunac Rastina

West
 FK Budućnost Valjevo
 FK FAP
 FK INON
 FK Jedinstvo Ub
 FK Loznica
 FK Mačva Šabac
 FK Metalac Kraljevo
 FK Radnički Stobex
 FK Sloboda Čačak
 FK Sloboda Užice
 FK Sloga Kraljevo
 FK Sloga Požega
 FK Sloga Petrovac na Mlavi
 FK Vujić Voda
 FK Železničar Lajkovac

East
 FK Balkanski
 FK Car Konstantin
 FK Dubočica
 FK Hajduk Veljko
 FK Jedinstvo Bošnjace
 FK Jedinstvo Paraćin
 FK Kopaonik Brus
 FK Radnik Surdulica
 FK Radnički Pirot
 FK Radnički Svilajnac
 FK Radnički Niš
 FK Rudar Alpos
 FK Svrljig
 FK Timok Zaječar
 FK Vlasina
 FK Župa Aleksandrovac

Zone League (Fourth tier)

Belgrade
 PKB Padinska Skela
 FK Zvezdara
 FK Borac Ostružnica
 FK Budućnost Dobanovci
 FK Crvena zvezda MML
 FK GSP Polet
 FK IMT
 FK Radnički Beograd
 FK Lasta Sremčica
 FK Lokomotiva Beograd
 FK Milutinac Zemun
 FK Posovac
 FK Poštar Beograd
 FK Slavija Beograd
 FK Trudbenik Beograd
 FK Turbina Vreoci
 FK Vinča
 FK Radnički Rudovci
 FK Železničar Beograd

Vojvodina East
 FK Bačka 1901
 FK Bačka Topola
 FK Budućnost Srpska Crnja
 FK Dinamo Pančevo
 FK Jedinstvo Novi Bečej
 FK Kozara Banatsko Veliko Selo
 FK Obilić Novi Kneževac
 FK Radnički Bajmok
 FK Radnički Zrenjanin
 FK Bačka Topola
 FK Spartak Debeljača
 FK Vojvodina Novo Miloševo
 FK AFK Ada
 FK Zadrugar Lazarevo
 FK Borac Starčevo
 FK Proleter Banatski Karlovac

Vojvodina West
 FK Bačka Bačka Palanka
 FK 1. Maj Agroruma
 FK Borac Novi Sad
 FK Budućnost Mladenovo
 FK Crvenka
 FK Crvena Zvezda Novi Sad
 FK Jedinstvo Stara Pazova
 FK Jugović Kać
 FK Mladost Turija
 FK Polet Karavukovo
 FK Radnički Irig
 FK Radnički Sremska Mitrovica
 FK Metalac Futog
 FK Dunav Stari Banovci
 FK Indeks Novi Sad
 FK Obilić Zmajevo
 FK Sloga Erdevik
 Fk Kosanica

Pomoravlje-Timok
FK Bor
FK Borac Bivolje
SFS Borac
FK Dunav Prahovo
FK Đerdap
FK Kablovi Zaječar
FK Morava Ćuprija
FK Ozren Sokobanja
FK Pepeljevac
FK Slatina Bor
FK Prva Petoletka Trstenik
FK Putevi Zaječar
FK Radnički Svilajnac
FK Rudar Bor
FK Sloga Ćićevac
FK Temnić
FK Trayal Kruševac
FK Trgovački Jagodina

Niš
 BSK Bujanovac
 FK Bobište
 FK Jastrebac Blace
 FK Mladost Bosilegrad
 FK Mladost Lalinac
 FK Mladost Medoševac
 FK Morava Vladičin Han
 FK Napredak Aleksinac
 OFK Niš
 FK Pukovac
 FK Pusta Reka
 FK Radan Lebane
 FK Sloga Leskovac
 FK Topličanin
 FK Vučje
 FK Zaplanjac
 FK Žitorađa
 FK Zloćudovo

Dunav
 FK Beloševac
 FK Crvena zvezda Suvodol
 FK Homoljac Žagubica
 FK Jadar Gornji Dobrić
 FK Jadar Stupnica
 FK Krušik 04 Valjevo
 FK Morava Velika Plana
 FK Obilić Živica
 FK Omladinac Šetonje
 FK Radnički Valjevo
 FK Radnički Koceljeva
 FK Ribnica Mionica
 FK Rudar Kostolac
 FK Selevac
 FK Sloga Lipnički Šor
 VGSK Veliko Gradiste
 FK Vrbovac
 FK Zvižd Kučevo

Morava
 FK Bane
 FK Crnokosa
 FK Erdoglija Kragujevac
 FK Gruža
 FK Jedinstvo Putevi
 FK Mokra Gora
 FK Omladinac Novo Selo
 FK Orlovac
 FK Partizan Kosovska Mitrovica
 FK Pobeda Kragujevac
 FK Polet Ljubić
 FK Prijevor
 FK Sloga Bajina Bašta
 FK Sloga Sjenica
 FK Jošanica
 FK Šumadija Aranđelovac
 FK Takovo
 FK Vodojaža Grošnica

Drina
 FK Bajina Bašta
 FK FAP
 FK Luk
 FK Jedinstvo Vladimirci
 FK Jedinstvo Putevi
 FK Jadar Stupnica
 FK Krušik
 FK Osečina
 FK Polimlje
 FK Radnički Koceljeva
 FK Radnički Valjevo
 FK Radnički Zorka
 FK Sloga Lipnički Šor
 FK Sloga Sjenica
 FK Zlatar
 FK Zorka

District League (Fifth tier)

Belgrade First League
 FK Železnik
 FK Lepušnica
 FK Baćevac
 FK Zmaj Zemun
 FK Dunavac Grocka
 FK Poštar
 FK Komgrap
 FK Rakovica
 FK Policajac
 FK Rudar Beograd
 FK PKB Kovilovo
 FK PIK Zemun
 FK Borac Lazarevac
 FK Strelac Mislođin
 FK Prva Iskra Barič
 BSK Batajnica
 FK Podunavac
 FK Obilić

PFL Sombor
 FK Mladost Kurščić
 FK Hajduk Stapar
 FK PIK Prigrevica
 FK Zadrugar
 FK Kordun
 FK Omladinac Bukovac
 FK Graničar
 FK Crvenka
 FK ŽAK Sombor
 FK Borac Bački Gradac
 FK BSK Bački Brestovac
 FK Kula
 FK Polet Karavukovo
 FK Radnički Ratkovo
 OFK Odžaci

PFL Novi Sad
 FK Mladost Bački Petrovac
 FK Kabel
 FK Hercegovac Gajdobra
 FK Omladinac Stepanovićevo
 FK Borac Šajkaš
 FK Petrovaradin
 FK Slavija Novi Sad
 FK Vrbas
 FK Stari Grad
 FK Jedinstvo Rumenka
 FK Srbobran
 FK Šajkaš
 FK ŽSK Žabalj
 FK Tvrdjava Bač
 FK Železničar Novi Sad
 FK Bečej
 FK Buducnost Mladenovo

PFL Sremska Mitrovica
 FK Jedinstvo Stara Pazova
 FK Podrinje Mačvanska Mitrovica
 FK Sloven Ruma
 FK Graničar Adaševci
 FK Partizan Vitojevci
 FK Mladost Kupinovo
 FK Jadran Golubinci
 FK Sloga Milšped
 FK Hajduk Beška
 FK LSK Laćarak
 FK Zeka Buljubaša
 FK Hajduk Šimanovci
 FK Hajduk Višnjičevo
 FK Ljukovo
 FK Železničar Inđija
 FK Fruškogorac

Others



0-9
 FK 14. Oktobar

A
 FK Aluminijum Niš
 FK Arsenal Kragujevac

B
 FK Bačka Bačka Palanka
 FK BAK Bela Crkva
 Backovac United 
 FK Begej Žitište
 FK Bežbednost Valjevo
 FK Bilećanin Sečanj
 FK BIP Čačak
 FK Borac Martinci
 FK Borac Žabari
 FK Borac Stejanovci
 FK Bosilegrad 
 FK BPI Pekar
 FK Bratstvo Krnjača
 FK Brestovac
 FK Brodoremont Kladovo
 FK Budućnost Alibunar
 FK Budućnost Arilje
 FK Budućnost Mladenovo
 FK Budućnost Prva Kutina
 FK Bukovik Ražanj
FK Brzi Brod

C
 FK Crni Vrh Miljević
 FK Crvena zvezda V.S.

D
 FK Dragačevo 
 FK Drina Ljubovija
 FK Dinamo Budisava

E
 FK Elan

F

G
 FK Goč Vrnjačka Banja
 FK Graničar Jamena

H

I
 FK Iskra Kucura 1912

J
 FK Jablanica Gornji Milanovac
 FK Jablanica Medveđa
 FK Jadran Golubinci
 FK Jadar Draginac 
 GFK Jasenica 1911 
 FK Jastrebac Niš 
 FK Jedinstvo Bela Palanka
 FK Jedinstvo Donja Mutnica
 FK Jedinstvo Platičevo
 FK Jedinstvo Mali Zvornik
 FK Jedinstvo Ruma
 FK Jedinstvo Surčin
 FK Jedinstvo Vladimirci
 FK Jugović Kać

K
 FK Karađorđe Mladost
 FK Krivelj
 FK Kordun Kljajićevo

L
 FK Lemind Leskovac
 FK Lešnica

 LSK Laćarak
 FK Lužnica Babušnica
 FK Lunjevica Gornji Milanovac
 FK Lipar
 FK Lisović
 FK Ljukovo
 FK Lehel

M
 FK Majdanpek
 FK Marjan Knićanin Knić
 FK Mićunovo
 FK Milicionar Bogatić
 FK Miločajac Miločaj
 FK Mladi Obilić Beograd
 FK Mladost, Novi Sad
 FK Mladost Omoljica
 FK Morava Ribare
 FK Mladost Prnjavor

N
 FK Naša krila Belotinac
 FK Novi Beograd

O
 FK Omladinac Malošište
 FK Omladinac Novi Banovci
 FK Omladinac Slepčević

P
 FK Panonija
 FK Pančevo
   FK Partizan Kaluđerica
   FK Partizan Susek
 FK Plavi Dunav 
 FK Polet Aleksandrovac
 FK Polet Sivac
 FK Polet Nakovo
 FK Polet Trbušani
 FK Polimlje, Prijepolje
 FK Poreč Donji Milanovac

R
 FK Radnik Stari Tamiš

 FK Rudna Glava
 FK Rusin Ruski Krstur

S
 FK Spartak Ljig
 FK Slavija Kragujevac
 FK Slavija Novi Sad
 FK Sloga Despotovac
 FK Stanovo Kragujevac
 FK Sloga Lipovica
 FK Sloga Miloševac
 FK Sloboda Lipe
 FK Socanica Leposavic
 FK Sloga Čonoplja

T
 FK Tempo Sefkerin
 FK Tvrdjava Bač
 FK Trepča Kosovska Mitrovica

V
 FK Vrbas
 FK Vinogradar

Z
 FK Zadrugar Lajkovac
 FK Železničar Inđija
 FK Železničar Novi Sad
 FK Železničar Niš
 FK Železničar Smederevo
 FK Zlatar Nova Varoš
 FK Zlatibor Čajetina
 FK Zlot
 FK ŽAK Kikinda
 FK ŽSK Žabalj

See also 
 List of football clubs in Vojvodina
 List of futsal clubs in Serbia

External links
 Serbian Superliga  
 Prva Liga 
 Srpska Liga 
 Zonska Liga 

 
Serbia
Clubs
Football clubs